Milbank is a surname, and may refer to:

 Frederick Acclom Milbank, 1st Baronet (1820–1898), English peer and politician 
 Powlett Milbank, 2nd Baronet (1881–1964), English peer and politician 
 Mark Milbank, 4th Baronet (1907–1984),  British Army officer and courtier
 Jane Hungerford Milbank (1871–1931), American suffragette
 Jeremiah Milbank (1818–1884), American businessman
 John Milbank, English Anglican theologian
 Dana Milbank, US journalist

Titles 
Two hereditary peerages are associated with the name Milbank/ Milbanke:

 Milbank baronets, a title in the Baronetage of England, created 1882
Milbanke baronets, a title in the Baronetage of England created in 1661 for a branch of the same family (spelling variation)

Milbank may also refer to 
Milbank LLP, an international law firm founded by Albert G. Milbank
Milbank, New South Wales
Milbank, South Dakota
Milbank, Virginia
Milbank Quarterly, medical journal

See also
Barningham Park, Grade II* listed country house and 7,000 acre estate owned by the Milbank family since the 1600s
Milbanke, a spelling variation of this surname
Millbank (disambiguation)